Rødven Church is a parish church of the Church of Norway in Rauma Municipality in Møre og Romsdal county, Norway. It is located in the village of Rødven. It is one of the churches for the Eid og Holm parish which is part of the Indre Romsdal prosti (deanery) in the Diocese of Møre. The red, wooden church was built in a long church design in 1907 using plans drawn up by the architect Jens Zetlitz Monrad Kielland from Bergen. The church seats about 120 people.

History
The parish structure in the Old Veøy Church parish was changed around 1900, as Holm parish was established in 1901. In this process, the two very old churches Old Veøy Church and Rødven Stave Church were replaced by three fairly similar dragestil churches in 1907. Holm Church became the main church on the south side of the Langfjorden and the new Veøy Church was the main church to the north of the fjord. Both of those churches were designed by Karl Norum. After the new Rødven Chapel was completed, the old stave church was closed and turned into a museum. Later, the Rødven chapel was upgraded in status to a parish church and renamed Rødven Church.

Media gallery

See also
List of churches in Møre

References

Rauma, Norway
Churches in Møre og Romsdal
Long churches in Norway
Wooden churches in Norway
20th-century Church of Norway church buildings
Churches completed in 1907
1907 establishments in Norway